Roger Léon Maurice Lemerre-Desprez (born 18 June 1941) is a French professional football manager and former player. During his managerial career, he was in charge of the French, Tunisian and Moroccan national teams. He also managed numerous clubs in France, Tunisia, Turkey and Algeria. He is currently the head coach of Étoile du Sahel.

Playing career

His professional playing career spanned 15 seasons, from 1961 to 1975: between 1961 and 1969 he played for Sedan and lost the Cup in 1965, before moving to Nantes (1968–1971), Nancy (1971–1973) and Lens (1973–1975). He won six caps for France between 1968 and 1971.

Managerial career
Between 1975 and 1978, he was the coach of Red Star from Saint-Ouen, and then went back to RC Lens for a season as coach, before moving to Paris FC for two seasons. In the 1983–1984 season, he ran Espérance Sportive de Tunis in Tunisia. On his return to France, he again took up his post as Red Star manager.

For 10 seasons, he coached the French national military team, with whom he won the World Championships.

In 1997, he finished the season with Lens and saved it from relegation.

He assisted Aimé Jacquet in the French team's 1998 World Cup victory. This paved the way for him to take over as the national coach, winning Euro 2000 in Netherlands and Belgium and FIFA Confederations Cup next year. However, after the team suffered a stunning first-round exit in the 2002 FIFA World Cup, he was sacked by the French Football Federation.

Undeterred, the Tunisian Football Federation soon hired Lemerre to be the manager of their national side. There, he guided them to victory in the African Nations Cup in 2004 making him first coach in football history to win two different continental tournaments i.e. Euro 2000 and AFCON 2004, and led them to qualification for the 2006 FIFA World Cup in Germany. He was sacked in February 2008 following the team's exit from the 2008 African Cup of Nations in the quarter-finals.

Lemerre was named the new head coach of Morocco national team in May 2008 and took charge on 1 July. He was fired on 9 July 2009, for disappointing results.
On 18 December 2009, he accepted a managing job at Ankaragücü on a six-month deal that could be extended if both parties agreed. Former Turkey international Ümit Özat was appointed as his assistant coach. In May 2010, despite the fact that Lemerre had turned the team around and possibly saved them from relegation, the club decided not to extend Lemerre's contract and he was replaced by his assistant Ümit Özat for the 2009–10 season.

In December 2013, Lemerre agreed a six-month deal to take a coaching job at Tunisian team Étoile du Sahel.

In January 2016 he became new manager of CS Sedan Ardennes.

Honours

As manager
France
UEFA European Championship: 2000
FIFA Confederations Cup: 2001

Tunisia
African Cup of Nations: 2004

Étoile du Sahel
Tunisian Cup: 2013–14
Arab Club Champions Cup: 2018–19

Orders
Chevalier of the Ordre national du Mérite: 1998
Chevalier of the Légion d'honneur: 2001
 Grand Officer of the National Order of Merit of Tunisia: 2004

References

External links

 French Profile and pictures of Roger Lemerre
 
 

1941 births
Living people
Sportspeople from Manche
2001 FIFA Confederations Cup managers
2002 FIFA World Cup managers
2005 FIFA Confederations Cup managers
2006 FIFA World Cup managers
2004 African Cup of Nations managers
2006 Africa Cup of Nations managers
2008 Africa Cup of Nations managers
Association football defenders
AS Nancy Lorraine players
CS Sedan Ardennes players
FC Nantes players
France international footballers
France national football team managers
French football managers
French footballers
Ligue 1 players
Paris FC managers
RC Lens managers
RC Lens players
RC Strasbourg Alsace managers
Red Star F.C. managers
UEFA Euro 2000 managers
UEFA European Championship-winning managers
FIFA Confederations Cup-winning managers
Tunisia national football team managers
Morocco national football team managers
Espérance Sportive de Tunis managers
Étoile Sportive du Sahel managers
French expatriate football managers
Expatriate football managers in Tunisia
Expatriate football managers in Turkey
CS Constantine managers
Expatriate football managers in Algeria
Süper Lig managers
French expatriate sportspeople in Turkey
Knights of the Ordre national du Mérite
Chevaliers of the Légion d'honneur
Footballers from Normandy